Multi-agency coordination (or MAC) is a generalized term which describes the functions and activities of representatives of involved agencies and/or jurisdictions who come together to make decisions regarding the prioritizing of incidents, and the sharing and use of critical resources. The MAC organization is not a part of an on-scene incident command system and is not involved in developing incident strategy or tactics.

See also
 Multi-agency Coordination (MAC) System

Incident management